Elbert Francis "Ebb" Caraway (January 1, 1905 – September 8, 1975) was an American football and baseball player and coach.  He served as the head football coach at Massachusetts State College, now the University of Massachusetts Amherst, from 1936 to 1940, tallying a mark of 9–32–3.  Caraway was also the head baseball coach at Massachusetts State from 1937 to 1941 and at Lehigh University from 1942 to 1952, compiling a career college baseball record of 122–130–2.  Caraway attended Purdue University and played end for the Purdue Boilermakers from 1927 to 1929.  He also played baseball at Purdue and was captain of the 1930 squad.  Caraway first went to Lehigh in 1933 as the ends coach on the football team under A. Austin Tate and continued the following season under fellow Purdue alumnus Glen Harmeson.  Caraway died of an attack on September 8, 1975, at his home in Carthage, New York.

Head coaching record

Football

Baseball

References

External links
 
 

1905 births
1975 deaths
American football ends
Beaumont Exporters players
Lehigh Mountain Hawks baseball coaches
Lehigh Mountain Hawks football coaches
Purdue Boilermakers baseball players
Purdue Boilermakers football players
Shawnee Robins players
UMass Minutemen baseball coaches
UMass Minutemen football coaches
People from Sherman, Texas